Eupithecia miserulata, the common eupithecia, is a moth of the family Geometridae. The species was first described by Augustus Radcliffe Grote in 1863 and it can be found in North America, from Ontario and Maine in the north to Florida, Mississippi, Louisiana and Texas in the south. It is also found in Arizona and California.

The wingspan is 12–20 mm. The forewings are grayish to grayish brown. The hindwings are the same color, but have a small discal spot and a variably represented an extradiscal line. The moths flies from March to November depending on the location.

The larvae feed on a wide range of plants, including coneflower, asters, willows, cherry, juniper and clover.

Subspecies
Eupithecia miserulata miserulata (most of eastern North America)
Eupithecia miserulata vitans Schaus, 1913
Eupithecia miserulata zela Swett & Cassino, 1919 (California)

References

External links

miserulata
Moths described in 1863
Moths of North America